Phtheochroa annae is a species of moth of the family Tortricidae. It is found in Austria, the Czech Republic, Slovakia, Hungary, Romania and Greece.

The wingspan is about 21–23 mm. Adults have been recorded on wing from April to May.

The larvae feed on Bryonia dioica.

References

Moths described in 1989
Phtheochroa